is a Tokyu Tamagawa Line station located in Ōta, Tokyo.

Station layout
The station is composed of two ground-level side platforms.

History
May 2, 1924: The station opens.
October 1998: The station becomes unmanned (it’s controlled by Kamata Station).
In 2021, the average number of daily passengers at Shimomaruko Station was 28,099, the second-most of all the stations on the Tokyo Tamagawa line.

References 

Railway stations in Japan opened in 1924
Tokyu Tamagawa Line
Stations of Tokyu Corporation
Railway stations in Tokyo